Všestary may refer to places in Czech Republic:

Všestary (Hradec Králové District)
Všestary (Prague-East District)